A hill town is any citadel town built upon hills to make invasion difficult. Often protected by defensive walls, steep embankments, or cliffs, such hilltop settlements provided natural defenses for their inhabitants.

In Europe, especially in Italy, Spain, Portugal and southern France, such towns were common.
 The Spanish even brought the traditional European hill town to the Americas, a notable example being the 16th century Mexican hill town of Guanajuato.  However, fortified hill towns were by no means solely a European creation.  For instance, Incan fortified hill towns predated  the  arrival of the Spanish by many centuries and rival those of Europe.  Machu Picchu, an Incan hill town completed in the mid-15th century in Peru, although now in ruins, is considered perhaps the most beautiful hill town ever constructed.  Construction of fortified hill towns was common in many civilizations. Ancient examples can also be found in Africa and Asia.

Around the world, the most famous examples are the hilltowns of Darjeeling and Simla.

In recent years, Bill Buchanan, Douglas Duany, Lucien Steil and others have studied hill towns with an interest in reviving interest in the enduring form.

Buchanan has argued that the form gives comfort regardless of current threat, as we've evolved to like our back protected while able to view all who approach.
It makes our space inhabited large, he contends.

See also
List of hilltowns in Northern Italy
List of hilltowns in Central Italy
List of hilltowns in Southern Italy
Hill people

Hills
Types of towns